This list of botanical gardens and arboretums in Tennessee is intended to include all significant botanical gardens and arboretums in the U.S. state of Tennessee

See also
List of botanical gardens and arboretums in the United States

References 

 
Arboreta in Tennessee
botanical gardens and arboretums in Tennessee